In abstract algebra, a partial algebra is a generalization of universal algebra to partial operations.

Example(s)
 partial groupoid
 field — the multiplicative inversion is the only proper partial operation
 effect algebras

Structure
There is a "Meta Birkhoff Theorem" by Andreka, Nemeti and Sain (1982).

References

Further reading

 
 

Algebraic structures